Sportvereniging Kampong Hockey, also known as SV Kampong or simply Kampong, is a Dutch field hockey club based in Utrecht. It was founded in 1902, making it the second oldest hockey club in the Netherlands.

Both the men's and the women's 1st XI compete in the Hoofdklasse, country's top-tier league. The men's team won the league in 2017, after 32 years without a national title, after a clash with Rotterdam. They have also competed in the Euro Hockey League.

Etymology
The term 'Kampong' is Javanese in origin. Having hundreds years of relationship with Java island (especially during the Dutch colonialism on Indonesia), Javanese language influenced some vocabulary in Dutch language. The term ꦏꦩ꧀ꦥꦸꦁ​ (kampung) literally means "village" in Javanese, it refers to the historical fact that these hockey club was once played in the villages in Java.

Honours

Men
National title / Hoofdklasse
 Winners (8): 1967–68, 1971–72, 1972–73, 1973–74, 1975–76, 1984–85, 2016–17, 2017–18
 Runners-up (9): 1966–67, 1976–77, 1979–80, 1981–82, 1985–86, 1989–90, 2014–15, 2018–19, 2020–21
Euro Hockey League
 Winners (1): 2015–16
 Runners-up (1): 2017–18
European Cup
 Winners (1): 1986
 Runners-up (1): 1974
Cup Winners' Cup
 Winners (1): 1991
Hoofdklasse Indoor
 Winners (2): 2006–07, 2012–13

Women
Hoofdklasse
 Winners (2): 1993–94, 1994–95
 Runners-up (1): 1995–96
European Cup
 Winners (2): 1995, 1996
Cup Winners' Cup
 Winners (1): 1997
Hoofdklasse Indoor
 Winners (7): 2004–05, 2005–06, 2006–07, 2008–09, 2009–10, 2010–11, 2015–16

Players

Current squad

Women's squad
Head coach: Fleur van de Kieft

Men's squad
Head coach: Roelant Oltmans

Notable players

Men's internationals

 Grant Schubert

 David Harte

 Dean Couzins

 Ramón Alegre

Women's internationals

/
Sophie Bray

 María López
 Georgina Oliva

References

External links

 
Dutch field hockey clubs
1902 establishments in the Netherlands
Field hockey clubs established in 1902
Sports clubs in Utrecht (city)